Fr. Timothy Leonard was an Irish priest from Ballysimon, Co. Limerick. He went as part of the first group of priests from the Maynooth Mission to China in 1920 and he was killed by Communist bandits in July 1929. He was the first Columban Father to be killed on mission. Timothy was born in July 1893 to William a Farmer and his wife Maryanne Leonard, in the parish of Killmurray, Killronan, Ballysimon, Co. Limerick.
He attended Monaleen National School and later as a boarder at St Munchin's College in Limerick. Fr. Leonard studied in Maynooth College and was ordained a priest for the Diocese of Limerick in 1918.
In 1928, the Holy See assigned the Columbans a new district in the Province of Kiangsi previously ministered by the Vincentians, Fr. Tim was one of the Columbans who moved to Kiangsi.

Two of his brothers Joseph and William also became priests.

Death
In July 1929 after a raid by Communist bandits who had targeted him, as he said mass, he was badly wounded and put 'on trial' before three of the Communists in their twenties who acted as Judges, he was found guilty of being hostile to the people of China, friendly with the Nationalists, and being a foreign spy, he was taken out thrown on the ground and hacked to death, his body was found on 18 July.

References

1893 births
1931 deaths
Clergy from County Limerick
Alumni of St Patrick's College, Maynooth
20th-century Irish Roman Catholic priests
Missionary Society of St. Columban